Portal often refers to:
Portal (architecture), an opening in a wall of a building, gate or fortification, or the extremities (ends) of a tunnel

Portal may also refer to:

Arts and entertainment

Gaming
 Portal (series), a series of video games developed by Valve
 Portal (video game), a 2007 video game, the first in the series
 Portal 2, the 2011 sequel
 Portal Stories: Mel, a mod for Portal 2
 Portal (1986 video game), a 1986 computer game by Activision
 Portal (Magic: The Gathering), a set in the Magic: The Gathering card game
 Portal (video game element), an element in video game design

Music 
 Portal (band), an Australian extreme metal band
 Portal (album), a 1994 album by Wendy & Carl
 Portals (Arsonists Get All the Girls album), 2009
 Portals (Sub Focus and Wilkinson album), 2020
 "Portals", by Alan Silvestri, from the soundtrack for the film Avengers: Endgame
 Portals (EP), a 2022 EP by Kirk Hammett
 Portals (Melanie Martinez album), 2023

Other uses in arts and entertainment
 Portal (comics), a Marvel Comics character
 Portal (magic trick), an illusion performed by David Copperfield
 Portal (TV series), a series about MMORPGs
 Portals (initiative), a public art initiative that connects people in different world cities through real-time videoconferencing
 The Portal (podcast), a podcast hosted by Eric Weinstein

Computing

Gateways to information
 Captive portal, controlling connections to the Internet
 Enterprise portal, a framework to provide a single point of access to a variety of information and tools
 Intranet portal, a gateway that unifies access to all enterprise information and applications
 Web portal, a site that functions as a point of access to information on the World Wide Web

Other uses in computing
 Facebook Portal, a screen-enhanced smart speaker
 Portal rendering, an optimization technique in 3D computer graphics
 Portals network programming API, a high-performance networking programming interface for massively parallel supercomputers
 Portal Software, a company based in Cupertino, California

Places 
 Portal, Arizona
 Portal, Georgia
 Portal, Nebraska
 Portal, North Dakota
 Portal Peak, a mountain in Canada
 Portal, Tarporley, a country house near Tarporley, Cheshire, England
 Portal Bridge, over the Hackensack River in New Jersey

Organisations
 Clube Atlético Portal, a football club based in Uberlândia, Brazil
 Portals Athletic F.C., a defunct football club, based in Overton, England
 Portals (paper makers), a UK paper making company

Other uses 
 Portal frame, a construction method
 Portal stones, a type of stone monument
 Portal (surname), shared by several notable people
 Portal venous system, an occurrence where one capillary bed drains into another through veins
 Hepatic portal system, the portal system between the digestive system and the liver
 Hepatic portal vein, a vein that drains blood from the digestive system
 Hypophyseal portal system

See also 
 Conduit (channeling)
 The Portal (disambiguation)
 Porthole, a window in the hull of a ship
 Wormhole